The Italian military intervention in Spain took place during the Spanish Civil War in order to support the nationalist cause against the Second Spanish Republic. As the conquest of Ethiopia in the Second Italo-Ethiopian War made Italy confident in its power, Benito Mussolini joined the war to expand the Fascist sphere of influence in the Mediterranean. The Royal Italian Navy played a substantial role in the Mediterranean blockade, and ultimately Italy supplied machine guns, artillery, aircraft, tankettes, the Aviazione Legionaria, and the Corpo Truppe Volontarie (CTV) to the Nationalist cause. The Italian CTV would, at its peak, supply the Nationalists with 70,000 men. Italian warships took part in breaking the Republican navy's blockade of Nationalist-held Spanish Morocco and took part in naval bombardment of Republican-held Málaga, Valencia, and Barcelona.

In 1938 and 1939 Italian planes carried out most of the large-scale bombing operations, striking the cities of Barcelona, Alicante, Granollers, and Valencia, as well as the railway stations of Sant Vicenç de Calders and Xàtiva. With a total of 728 raids on Spanish Mediterranean cities, the Aviazione Legionaria dropped 16,558 bombs  and inflicted numerous casualties.
By the end of the conflict the Aviazione Legionaria had logged a total of 135,265 hours' flying time on 5,318 operations, dropping 11,524 tons of bombs and destroying 943 enemy air units and 224 ships. In total, Italy provided the Nationalists with 660 planes, 150 tanks, 800 artillery pieces, 10,000 machine guns, and 240,000 rifles.

Organization
Aviazione Legionaria (Air force)
Corpo Truppe Volontarie (Army)
Italian Naval Mission (Navy)
Submariners Legion

See also
German involvement in the Spanish Civil War

References

Spanish Civil War
Italy–Spain relations